London Road is a cricket club in Sleaford, Lincolnshire. It is the home of Sleaford Cricket Club and an occasional venue for Lincolnshire County Cricket Club.

The ground was established in 1851, when Sleaford played an All-England Eleven. In 1860 and 1864, two first-class matches were played on the ground in the North v South fixtures. The first Minor Counties Championship match played on the ground was in 1912 between Lincolnshire and Cambridgeshire.  To date the ground has hosted 45 Minor Counties matches.

The first List-A match played on the ground came in 1983 NatWest Trophy between Lincolnshire and Surrey. From 1983 to 2002, the ground hosted five List-A matches, the last of which came in the 2002 Cheltenham & Gloucester Trophy between Lincolnshire and Glamorgan.

References

External links
London Road on CricketArchive
London Road on Cricinfo

Cricket grounds in Lincolnshire
Sports venues completed in 1851
1851 establishments in England
Sleaford